The women's team sabre fencing competition at the Beijing 2008 Summer Olympics took place on August 14 at the Olympic Green Convention Centre.

The team sabre competition consisted of a three-round single-elimination bracket with a bronze medal match between the two semifinal losers and classification semifinals and finals for 5th to 8th places. Teams consist of three members each, and a substitute. Matches consist of nine bouts, with every fencer on one team facing each fencer on the other team. Scoring carried over between bouts with a total of 45 touches being the team goal. Bouts lasted until one team reached the target multiple of 5 touches. For example, if the first bout ended with a score of 5–3, that score would remain into the next bout and the second bout would last until one team reached 10 touches. Bouts also had a maximum time of three minutes each; if the final bout ended before either team reached 45 touches, the team leading at that point won. A tie at that point would result in an additional one-minute sudden-death time period. This sudden-death period was further modified by the selection of a draw-winner beforehand; if neither fencer scored a touch during the minute, the predetermined draw-winner won the bout.

Draw

Finals

Classification 5- 8

Final classification

References
 Competition format

Fencing at the 2008 Summer Olympics
2008 in women's fencing
Women's events at the 2008 Summer Olympics